Neusalza-Spremberg is a town in the district Görlitz, in Saxony, Germany. It is situated on the border with the Czech Republic, on the river Spree, 6 km northwest of Ebersbach, and 17 km southeast of Bautzen.

Number of inhabitants
1925:	3,675
1939:	3,701
1946:	4,436
1950:	4,723
1964:	4,204
1990:	2,862
2000:	2,567
2005:	2,488
2006:  2,442
2007: 	3,812 (after incorporation of Friedersdorf)
2009:	3,691
2012:	3,453
2013:	3,420
2015:  3,356

Mayor
Matthias Lehmann was reelected in June 2022.

Sons and daughters of the town and its district Friedersdorf

 Karl Thieme (1862-1932), theologian, extraordinary professor for Theology at the University of Leipzig
 Paul Reichelt (1898-1981), German General of the Wehrmacht and the Bundeswehr

References

Towns in Görlitz (district)